Elliot Calvin Howe (February 14, 1828 – March 2, 1899) was an American botanist and a member of the Torrey Botanical Club. Most notably, he discovered several species of fungi throughout his life, including Tricholoma Peckii, Hygrophorus Peckianus, Puccinia curtipes, P. Peckianus, Microsphaera menispermi, M. platani and M. symphoricarpi, and two were named after him to commemorate his contributions to the field, Stropharia Howeanum Pk. and Hypoxylon Howeanum Pk.

References 

19th-century American botanists
Torrey Botanical Society members
American mycologists
People from Jamaica, Vermont
1828 births
1899 deaths